FK Baník Ratíškovice is a football club from the South Moravian village of Ratíškovice, Czech Republic. It currently plays in the regional division.

Baník Ratíškovice played in the Czechoslovak Second League in the 1959–1960 and 1962–1963 seasons; and in the Czech 2. Liga from 1999 to 2002. The greatest achievement of the club was finishing runners-up in the 1999–2000 Czech Cup. After relegation from the Second League in 2002, the club struggled with financial problems and further relegations to lower divisions followed.

Historical names 
 1930–1945 – DSK Ratíškovice
 1945–1948 – Ratíškovický SK
 1948–1953 – Sokol Ratíškovice
 1953–1993 – TJ Baník Ratíškovice
 1993–1996 – SK Kontakt Moravia Ratíškovice
 1996–2002 – SK Baník Ratíškovice
 2002–present – FK Baník Ratíškovice

Honours 
Czech Cup
Runners-Up 1999–2000
Moravian–Silesian Football League (third tier)
 Champions 1998–99

External links 
  Information at the municipal website

Banik Ratiskovice
Banik Ratiskovice
Hodonín District